Maria Dorothea Walpurgis Chandelle (22 July 1784 – 17 March 1866) was a German pastellist.

Life 
Chandelle was born on 22 July 1784 in Frankfurt am Main, the third daughter of eight children of the Frankfurt pastellist and postal official Andreas Joseph Chandelle (1763–1820) and his wife Anna Rosina née Wiesen (1752–1832). Matthäus Georg von Chandelle, the ennobled Bishop of Speyer, was her uncle. The Frankfurt sculptor Cornelius Andreas Donett (1683–1748) was one of her great-grandfathers.

Chandelle learned pastel drawing from her father and mainly created portraits, flower paintings, and religious depictions. In 1921, Lothar Brieger wrote in his work Das Pastell: "The most outstanding native Frankfurt pastel painters are Andreas Joseph Chandelle and his daughter Dorothea".

She died in 1866, almost blind and impoverished.

Notes

References 
 Brieger, Lothar (1921). Das Pastell. Seine Geschichte und seine Meister. Berlin: Verlag für Kunstwissenschaft. p. 254.
 Hohm, Andreas (2016). "Andreas Joseph Chandelle (1743–1820) – Leben und Werk". In Kunst in Hessen und am Mittelrhein. Darmstadt: Hessisches Landesmuseum. pp. 69–87.
 Oliver, Valerie Cassel, ed. (2011). "Chandelle, Dorothea". In Benezit Dictionary of Artists. Oxford University Press (access by subscription)

Further reading
 Gwinner, Philipp Friedrich (1862). Kunst und Künstler in Frankfurt am Main vom 13. Jahrhundert bis zur Eröffnung des Städel’schen Kunstinstituts. Frankfurt: Joseph Baer. pp. 388–389. (digitised version)
 Kurzwelly, Johannes (1912). "Chandelle, Dorothea". In Thieme, Ulrich (ed.). Allgemeines Lexikon der bildenden Künstler von der Antike bis zur Gegenwart. 6. Carlini–Cioci. Leipzig: E. A. Seemann. p. 360. (digitised version)

External links 
 Hohm, Andreas (2015). "Maria Dorothea Walpurgis Chandelle (1784-1866)". Frankfurter Frauenzimmer. Historisches Museum Frankfurt. Retrieved 18 April 2022.

1784 births
1866 deaths
19th-century German women artists
Artists from Frankfurt
Pastel artists